Red Storm Rising is a simulation video game based on Tom Clancy's 1986 novel Red Storm Rising and released in 1988 by MicroProse. The player is put in charge of an American SSN submarine in the Norwegian Sea Theater with the overall role of a hunter killer performing various missions in the context of the global conflict described in the book representing a campaign. Its original Commodore 64 version was co-designed and co-programmed by the famous game designer Sid Meier.

Plot
Missions may include interdiction of tanker fleets, stopping amphibious landing forces, eliminating Soviet wolf pack submarines and many others. The background story remains true to the book's plot but the final mission is always to prevent the Soviets from launching nuclear missiles by locating and eliminating their ballistic missile submarines.

Gameplay
The player may choose from four different timelines. Starting in the early 1980s limits the player to Permit,  or early -class submarines, but the Soviets have weak sonar, whereas starting in the late 1980s allows the player to use the improved Los Angeles class and even the newer  subs. Weapons improve accordingly, with Tomahawk missiles and improved Mark 48 torpedoes included in later timelines but the Soviets begin deploying nuclear-powered aircraft carriers and much better anti-submarine warfare ships.

The goal of the game is always consistent: Inflicting as much damage as possible on the Soviets in the Norwegian Sea, thus allowing safe passage to supply convoys coming from America and preventing amphibious forces from conquering Norway and Iceland. In order to make contact with enemy forces, the player must navigate the sub in a map of the North Sea, depending on his sub's sensors as well as allied aircraft, satellites and SOSUS arrays to detect the Soviet forces.

Success or failure of the missions impacts the progress of the war depicted by shifts in the front line on a simple map of Europe. If the player fails in a mission then Soviet forces capture more territory, but if the player succeeds then NATO is able to resist the Soviet attacks. In the course of the campaign the player can gain rank and possibly earn medals as well. In the end of the war, a final score is calculated and the player is awarded a post-war rank if NATO wins the war; this rank can vary from commander to admiral depending on how successful they have been in their missions. A poor performance in the game, particularly in the final mission, means that the Soviets win the war and the player ends up with the rank of Tovarishch (comrade), becoming a political prisoner in a communist-ruled America.

Reception
Compute! called Red Storm Rising a "must" for fans of Tom Clancy or military simulations. Computer Gaming World in 1988 and 1992 gave the game four and a half stars out of five, commending it for balancing realism and gameplay while noting deviations from realism, such as the durability of the player's submarine. The reviewer noted the game is "relatively easy to learn and win. This reviewer does not mean that the challenge is absent, but while the challenge is omnipresent, it is surmountable". In a 1994 survey of wargames the magazine gave the title three-plus stars out of five, stating that it was "one of the best on the market". In 1996, the magazine ranked Red Storm Rising as the 39th best PC game of all time, calling it "a modern submarine combat game unmatched even by today's offerings, the play balance of scenarios, campaigns and realism was near perfect."

Cold Waters, a "spiritual successor" to Red Storm Rising, was released in 2017.

References

External links

Review in Run

1988 video games
Amiga games
Atari ST games
Cold War video games
Commodore 64 games
DOS games
MicroProse games
NEC PC-9801 games
Sid Meier games
Single-player video games
Submarine simulation video games
Tom Clancy games
Video games based on novels
Video games developed in the United States
World War III video games